Robert Wilson Walker (21 May 1922 – 13 September 1991) was a Scottish professional footballer, who played as a centre-forward. He made appearances in the English Football League for Bournemouth and Wrexham

References

1922 births
1991 deaths
Scottish footballers
Association football forwards
Aberdeen F.C. players
AFC Bournemouth players
Wrexham A.F.C. players
Footballers from Aberdeen
English Football League players